"de la O" is a surname of Spanish origin. 

De la O may refer to:

 Marco de la O (born 1978), Mexican actor
 Genovevo de la O (1876–1952), figure in the Mexican Revolution in Morelos
 Rogelio Ramírez de la O (born 1948), economist based in Mexico City
 Valentino de la O, host of the Val De La O Show

Spanish-language surnames